Kofei is a Papuan language of the Indonesian province of Papua, on the eastern shore of Cenderawasih Bay.

Kofei is lexically similar to the East Geelvink Bay languages and presumably belongs in that family, but is too poorly attested to be sure.

References

Languages of western New Guinea
East Geelvink Bay languages
Severely endangered languages